P.S. Your Cat is Dead! is a 2002 American comedy film directed by Steve Guttenberg. The film is based on the novel of the same name published by James Kirkwood, Jr. in 1972, and a 1975 play.

The film stars Guttenberg as Jimmy Zoole, an unemployed actor whose life is falling apart: his girlfriend has just left him, and his pet cat has just died of a bladder infection. One day he catches Eddie (Lombardo Boyar) in his apartment trying to rob him and ties the burglar up, but unexpectedly finds himself falling in love with Eddie. However, the film tones down the novel's original ending, in which Jimmy and Eddie team up to stage another crime and then run off together.

Cast
 Lombardo Boyar as Eddie Tesoro
 Steve Guttenberg as Jimmy Zoole
 Cynthia Watros as Kate
 A.J. Benza as Carmine
 Tom Wright as Fred Gable
 Shirley Knight as Aunt Claire
 Kenneth Moskow as Stewart Thomas

Reviews
On Metacritic, the film has a score of 33 out of 100 based on 11 reviews, indicating "generally unfavorable reviews". On Rotten Tomatoes, the film has an approval rating of 24% based on 17 reviews, with an average score of 4.5/10.

References

External links

LGBT-related comedy films
Films directed by Steve Guttenberg
Films based on multiple works
American LGBT-related films
2002 LGBT-related films
2002 films
Films based on American novels
2002 directorial debut films
2002 comedy films
2000s English-language films
2000s American films